Downie Point is a prominent headland located at the southern edge of Stonehaven Bay in Aberdeenshire, Scotland. (United Kingdom, 2004)  From the Stonehaven Harbour, there is a panoramic view of this cliff landform, especially from the tip of Bellman's Head.

History
Earliest known prehistory of the general area relates to Bronze Age discoveries at Spurryhillock and Fetteresso. (Hogan, 2008) To the south of Downie Point is Bowdun Head, on which elements of the early settlement of Stonehaven are situated. Slightly further to the south is the ruined Dunnottar Castle.

References
 United Kingdom Ordnance Survey Map, Landrwanger 45, Stonehaven and Banchory, 1:50,000 scale 2004
 C. Michael Hogan, Fetteresso Fieldnotes, The Modern Antiquarian (2008)

See also
Carron Water

Landforms of Aberdeenshire
Stonehaven
Headlands of Scotland